Ojakgyo Family (lit. Ojakgyo Brothers) is a South Korean television series starring Uee, Joo Won, Ryu Soo-young, Choi Jung-yoon, Jung Woong-in, Yeon Woo-jin, Baek Il-seob, and Kim Ja-ok. The family drama aired on KBS2 from August 6, 2011, to February 19, 2012, on Saturdays and Sundays at 19:55 for 58 episodes.

Plot
It is a story about a family consisting of a grandmother, father, mother, and four sons who live in Ojakgyo farm. The father is Hwang Chang-shik and the mother is Park Bok-ja. The oldest son, Hwang Tae-shik, is an almost-40-year-old physical therapist who has a son named Guk-su from a Filipina. At first, Tae-shik is embarrassed to admit Guk-su as his son and tries to hide Guk-su from his family. The second son, Hwang Tae-beom, is a reporter who marries his colleague, the rich Cha Su-yeong after getting her pregnant. Tae-beom has loved another girl, Han Hye-ryeong, but as Hye-ryeong leaves him, Tae-beom marries Su-yeong. His married life is often filled with trivial arguments and problems. The third son, Hwang Tae-hee, is a quiet detective. He is not Chang-shik's real son but he is Chang-shik's nephew. Sometimes, Tae-hee feels left out from his brothers. However, Chang-shik and Bok-ja really love him as a son that Tae-hee also regards them and their real sons as family. The youngest, Hwang Tae-pil, lately works to Su-yeong's aunt in her clothing store.

Then, a rich girl named Baek Ja-eun comes to the Ojakgyo farm and changes the Hwang family's lives. Her father is lost in the sea and her selfish stepmother leaves her after her father is bankrupt. Ja-eun's father is also accused of bribing the university to admit Ja-eun. Discouraged by the situation, Ja-eun finds her father's contract. Actually, Baek In-ho, her father, owns the Ojakgyo farm but he lends the farm to his friend Chang-shik for 10 years. Now after 10 years, Ja-eun determines to regain her rightful land and sell it to get money. Everyone in the Hwang family is unhappy with the news that even Bok-ja stole Ja-eun's contract and throws Ja-eun out of the house. Tae-hee who defends the right thing thinks that his family should get out of the farm and returns the farm to Ja-eun. Furthermore, he advises Ja-eun to be kind so that maybe Bok-ja will be willing to return the farm to her. Following his advice, Ja-eun buys a tent, lives outside the house, and helps on the farm. Later, it was that revealed Tae-hee's father, who is Chang-sik's brother, was hit and run by Baek In-ho's friend who framed him for 26 years ago.

Cast

Main characters
 Uee as Baek Ja-eun
Ja-eun is a 25-year-old college student majoring in animation who comes to live with the Hwang family. She has an evil stepmother, Jung Yoon-sook, whom her father later divorced. Her father, Baek In-ho, lends the Ojakgyo farm to Hwang Chang-shik. At first, Ja-eun is self-absorbed and childish but soon she learns to be a better girl and helpful to Bok-ja. Lonely Ja-eun misses her real mother; that's why she comes to like Bok-ja's motherly care.

 Joo Won as Hwang Tae-hee
A smart 30 year old detective who does not talk much, Tae-hee is raised by his uncle and aunt, who regard him as their own son. Tae-hee's father died long ago while his mother remarried and died after Tae-hee grew up. However, he never met his mother. Tae-hee has an older stepbrother named Kim Je-ha whom he dislikes. They both have a special bond with Ja-eun. Later he learns that Ja-eun's father Baek In-ho supposedly killed his birth father Hwang Chang-hun in a hit-and-run. Although his parents and grandmother don't want him to marry Ja-eun, Tae-hee works hard to reveal who is the true murderer so that he can marry Ja-eun.

 Ryu Soo-young as Hwang Tae-beom
Tae-beom is the second son of the family who becomes a reporter at IBC. He marries rich Su-yeong after his first love leaves him. He often argues with Su-yeong. His mother-in-law insults him because he is poor. Tae-beom learns to love Su-yeong and in the end, he also learns to understand his mother-in-law and become father of he and Su-yeong's daughter Cha Gom.

 Choi Jung-yoon as Cha Su-yeong
Su-yeong is the daughter of wealthy Hyun-jae and Yeo-gyeong. She is also a reporter like her husband Tae-beom. She is emotional and ambitious. Even later her career position is higher than Tae-beom's.

 Jung Woong-in as Hwang Tae-sik
Tae-sik, the oldest son and a physical therapist. He feels that he never makes his parents happy. And as a man in late 30, he is not married yet, so he is very excited when he becomes pretty Ye-jin' boyfriend. Unfortunately, he finds out that he has a son, Guk-su, from a Philippine woman. He dislikes Guk-su although finally he wants to admit Guk-su as his son. Eventually, he asks his friend Kim Mi-suk to married her and lives happily with her, her adopted daughter Ha-na, and Guk-su.

 Yeon Woo-jin as Hwang Tae-pil
Tae-pil, the youngest of four, is a loser, playboy, seasonal model. He seems to have a smooth tongue and keen eyes for rich ladies. He is not good at school that Tae-hee has to keep an eye on him so he can graduate from school. He often fights with Tae-hee for most of their youth. Later, Tae-pil works in Su-yeong's aunt's shop and flirts with her who is much older than he is and a divorcee. His parents and Nam Yeo-eul's sister don't agree with their relationship and in the end, they break up.

 Baek Il-seob as Hwang Chang-shik, the father 
Chang-shik lives happily with his wife, mother, and four sons which one of them is actually his nephew. Chang-shik's friend Baek In-ho lends him a farm to live for 10 years. Since Bok-ja is extremely happy when she gets the farm, Chang-shik does not dare to admit to her that the farm does not belong to them but In-ho. Soon, Chang-shik feels that he must be responsible for In-ho's daughter, Ja-eun. Previously, Chang-shik has been in debt, that his second son Tae-beom has to give him the money which Tae-beom has saved for his own wedding.

 Kim Ja-ok as Park Bok-ja, the mother
Diligent Bok-ja loves farming so much that she works hard to make the barren Ojakgyo farm fruitful. When she discovers that the farm actually does not belong to her, she is brokenhearted. She steals Ja-eun's contract and hides it. She also hates Ja-eun. However, when Ja-eun learns to be more understanding, Bok-ja loves her and acts as she is Ja-eun's mother. Bok-ja owns pear trees, chilies, ducks, and many more in her farm.

 Kim Yong-rim as Ship Kap-nyeon, the grandmother
She is Chang-sik's and Chang-hun's mother and grandmother of Hwang brothers. Her favorite grandchild is Tae-hee that she always defend Tae-hee because his father is already died.

 Kim Yong-gun as Cha Hyun-jae, Su-yeong's father
Hyun-jae was a transportation minister.

 Park Joon-geum as Nam Yeo-gyeong, Su-yeong's mother
Yeo-gyeong is a protective mother who spoils her only daughter Su-yeong. She cooks for her, organizes her clothes, wakes her up, and does many things for her precious Su-yeong, She even take all the wedding plans, the house, everything for her, later on Tae-beom gets irritated since she comes to their house without informing first.

Supporting characters
 Lee Young-ha as Baek In-ho, Ja-eun's father who marries three times
 Jo Mi-ryung as Jung Yoon-sook, Ja-eun's stepmother who betrayed her husband by playing with his subordinate
 Lee Dong-heon as Seo Dong-min, Tae-hee's trusted colleague
 Song Seon-mi as Nam Yeo-eul, Su-yeong's aunt who comes back from the United States before graduating and later becomes Tae-pil's love interest
 Jeon Mi-seon as Kim Mi-sook, Tae-sik's old school friend who raises her sister's daughter as her own daughter
 Park Hee-gun as Hwang Guk-su, Tae-sik's son
 Heo Tae-hee as Choi Hyun-wook, IBC reporter
 Yoon Joo-hee as Sung Ye-jin, Tae-sik's love who knows Tae-sik from her teacher, Cha Hyun-jae. 
 Gong Jeong-hwan as Gong Jae-hwan, IBC Social Affairs News director, Tae-beom's and Su-yeong's boss
 Jung Suk-won as Kim Je-ha, Tae-hee's stepbrother
 Kim Hae-in as Han Hye-ryeong, Tae-boem's first love

Guests 
 Jang Gwang as Retired officer Bong

Ratings
In the table below, the blue numbers represent the lowest ratings and the red numbers represent the highest ratings.

2011

Awards and nominations

References

External links
Ojakgyo Family official KBS website 

Korean Broadcasting System television dramas
2011 South Korean television series debuts
2012 South Korean television series endings
Korean-language television shows
South Korean comedy television series
South Korean romance television series
Television series by Chorokbaem Media